Dersu Uzala is a 1961 Soviet film adapted from the book by Vladimir Arsenyev about his travels in the Russian Far East with the native trapper Dersu Uzala. The film was directed by Agasi Babayan from a screenplay by screenwriter Igor Bolgarin. The film starred actors Adolf Shestakov and Kasym Zhakibayev.

Cast 
 Adolf Shestakov
 Kasym Zhakibayev
 Aleksandr Baranov	
 N. Gladkov
 Lev Lobov
 Spiridon Grigoryev
 A. Yevstifyev
 Mikhail Medvedev
 Pyotr Lyubeshkin
 Nikolai Khryashchikov

See also
Dersu Uzala (1975), a Soviet-Japanese film version directed by Akira Kurosawa

External links

Dersu Uzala Info

1961 films
1961 in the Soviet Union
Soviet adventure films
1960s Russian-language films
Films set in Khabarovsk Krai
Films set in Primorsky Krai
Films set in the Russian Empire 
Russian Far East